Monforte may refer to:

Places in Italy
Corleto Monforte, a comune in the province of Salerno
Monforte d'Alba, a comune in the province of Cuneo
Monforte San Giorgio, a comune in the province of Messina, Sicily
 A Lazio village near Casalattico, formerly called Mortale but renamed in honour of the Forte family

Places in Portugal
Castelo de Monforte (Chaves), a castle
Monforte da Beira, a parish in Castelo Branco Municipality
Monforte, Portugal, in Portalegre, Alto Alentejo, Alentejo

Places in Spain
Monforte de Lemos, a town or municipality in Lugo Province
Monforte del Cid, a town in the province of Alicante, Valencian Community
Monforte de Moyuela, a town in the province of Teruel, Aragon
Monforte de la Sierra, a town in the province of Salamanca, Castile-León

People
Sara Monforte (born 1980), Spanish footballer

See also
Monfort, a commune in Gers department, France
Montfort (disambiguation)